The 2006–07 Buffalo Sabres season was the 37th season of operation, 36th season of play, for the National Hockey League franchise that was established on May 22, 1970. The Season began with the team attempting to rebound from a disappointing end to the 2005–06 season, in which the Sabres advanced to the Eastern Conference Finals before losing in seven to the eventual Stanley Cup Champions, the  Carolina Hurricanes.

With the best regular-season record in the NHL, the Sabres were awarded the Presidents' Trophy for the first time in their history, and they also earned the top seed in the Eastern Conference playoffs.  They defeated the New York Islanders the New York Rangers in the first 2 rounds of the playoffs.  In the Eastern Conference Finals, however, the Sabres' season came to an end when they were defeated by the Ottawa Senators in game 5 of the Conference finals. As of 2023, this remains the last time the Sabres won a playoff series.

Offseason
The team lost several veterans to free agency, including J. P. Dumont, Jay McKee, Mike Grier, and Rory Fitzpatrick. Conversely, the team signed only one new player to the roster: defenseman Jaroslav Spacek.  The team planned to rely on young players from their own organization – Jiri Novotny, Paul Gaustad and Nathan Paetsch, to name a few—to fill the holes left by the departing players.

Controversy swirled around the team's logo and jersey, meanwhile, as the look was changed.  The team's colors were reverted to blue and gold, which they had worn from their addition to the league as an expansion team until 1996–97, when the colors were changed to black and red.  The new logo, though, was said to resemble to many a slug or a wig.  There were strong efforts to prevent the team from wearing this new jersey, although none were successful.  The team's new third jersey, meanwhile, featured the team's original logo.  Despite the controversy, the NHL reported that sales of Sabres merchandise were up approximately 1170% from the 2005–2006 season.

Regular season
The Sabres were very successful early in the season, tying an NHL record by winning their first ten games, before finally suffering a shootout loss to the Atlanta Thrashers.  They did not lose a game in regulation until exactly one month into the season, in their thirteenth game, when they lost to Toronto.  The Sabres also set an NHL record by winning their first ten road games of the season, not losing outside of HSBC Arena until November 18 in Ottawa.

On January 9, it was announced that three members of the Sabres had been voted to start the All-Star Game for the Eastern Conference: forward Daniel Briere, defenseman Brian Campbell, and goaltender Ryan Miller.  It was the first All-Star appearance for each.  In addition, as the Sabres had the best record in the Eastern Conference as of the end of All-Star voting, head coach Lindy Ruff was assigned to coach the Eastern Conference team.  Briere recorded a goal and four assists in the game, and was named Most Valuable Player of the game.  Thomas Vanek was also invited to All-Star Weekend to play in the YoungStars game.

On January 13, Jason Pominville recorded his 20th goal of the season, becoming the fourth Sabre (after Chris Drury, Thomas Vanek and Maxim Afinogenov) to record 20 goals before the All-Star break.  At the time of Pominville's 20th goal, no other team in the NHL had more than two players with 20 goals.  Daniel Briere became the fifth Sabre to record 20 goals as he scored a hat-trick on January 30 against the Boston Bruins. With the feat, the Sabres became the first team since the 1995–96 Pittsburgh Penguins to have five 20–goal scorers before February.  Four Sabres would go on to reach the 30-goal plateau. For the first time in 12 years, Buffalo was not shut-out in any of their 82 regular season games. Moreover, the Sabres led the NHL in goals scored and became the first team to score at least 200 even-strength goals during the regular season since the New Jersey Devils in 2000–01.

In February, the Sabres found themselves battling injury problems. Forward Tim Connolly had been on the long-term injury list all season, and he was joined by Paul Gaustad when a tendon in his leg was sliced on February 7 against the Ottawa Senators.  Jaroslav Spacek broke his left hand soon thereafter, and the Sabres lost Maxim Afinogenov, who broke his left wrist, and Jiri Novotny with a high ankle sprain. Ales Kotalik was next to go down, with a knee sprain, and forward Daniel Paille broke his finger.  Against the Ottawa Senators on February 22, captain Chris Drury was injured by a blow to the head by Chris Neil, sparking a wild brawl which saw a fight between Martin Biron and Senators goaltender Ray Emery, and later between Emery and Sabres enforcer Andrew Peters.

The Sabres were the last team to be involved in a trade in the 2006–07 season. On the day of the NHL trade deadline, though, they made four trades. Goaltender Martin Biron, who had been the longest-tenured Sabre, was sent to Philadelphia for Philadelphia's second-round pick in the 2007 NHL Entry Draft. Buffalo's fifth-round pick in that draft was sent to Columbus in exchange for another backup goalie, Ty Conklin. Jiri Novotny was sent along with Buffalo's 2007 first-round pick to Washington in exchange for Dainius Zubrus and Timo Helbling. Finally, the Sabres sent their fourth-round pick in 2007 to Nashville for Mikko Lehtonen, a minor league defenseman.

Due to injuries, many Sabres prospects were called up from the team's American Hockey League affiliate, the Rochester Americans, and made their NHL debuts during the season; Mike Card, Michael Funk, Patrick Kaleta, Clarke MacArthur, Mark Mancari, Michael Ryan, Andrej Sekera and Drew Stafford all played their first career NHL game during the 2006–07 season.

The Sabres finished with 298 goals scored (excluding 10 shootout-winning goals), the most in the League.

Season standings

Schedule and results

October

Record for month 10–0–1 (Home  4–0–1 Away 6–0–0)

November

Record for Month 9–3–1 (Home 4–2–1 Away  5–1–0)

December

Record for Month 9–4–1 (Home 5–2–0 Away  4–2–1)

January

Record for Month 6–7–1 (Home 4–3–0 Away 2–4–1)

February

Record for Month 8–2–1 (Home 5–0–1 Away 3–2–0)

March

Record for Month 8–5–2 (Home 5–3–0 Away 3–2–2)

April

Record for Month 3–1–0 (Home 1–0–0 Away 2–1–0)

 Green background indicates win.
 Red background indicates regulation loss.
 White background indicates overtime/shootout loss.

Playoffs 

The Sabres earned the #1 seed in the Eastern Conference by virtue of finishing with the highest point total in the conference.

Eastern Conference Quarter-finals: vs. (8) New York Islanders

The Sabres faced the New York Islanders in the first round of the playoffs.

Eastern Conference Semi-finals: vs. (6) New York Rangers

The Sabres faced the New York Rangers in the second round of the playoffs.  The Rangers advanced by sweeping the Atlanta Thrashers, the number three seed, in the first round.

Eastern Conference Finals: vs. (4) Ottawa Senators

The Sabres faced their division rivals, the Ottawa Senators, in the Eastern Conference Finals.  The Senators advanced by defeating the Pittsburgh Penguins in the first round and the New Jersey Devils in the second. The Sabres lost the series, 4 games to 1.

Player stats

Scoring leaders

Note: GP = Games played; G = Goals; A = Assists; Pts = Points; +/- = Plus/minus; PIM = Penalty minutes

*Stats reflect games played with Buffalo only.
 Note: Goaltenders are not assessed plus/minus ratings.

Thomas Vanek
Thomas Vanek finished the season with the best plus/minus rating in the entire NHL with a +47.

Goaltending

Note: GP = Games played; Min = Minutes played; W = Wins; L = Losses; OTL = OvertimelLosses; GA = Goals against; SO = Shutouts; SV% = Save percentage; GAA = Goals against average

*Stats reflect games played with Buffalo only.

Coaching staff
 Lindy Ruff – Head Coach
 Brian McCutcheon – Associate Head Coach
 James Patrick – Assistant Coach
 Jim Corsi – Goaltender Coach
 Doug McKenney – Strength and Conditioning Coach

Transactions

Trades

Free agents acquired

Free agents lost

Lost to waivers

Draft picks
Buffalo's picks at the 2006 NHL Entry Draft in Vancouver, British Columbia.  The Sabres had the 24th overall draft pick for their success in the 2005–06 NHL season.

Farm teams
The Rochester Americans were the Buffalo Sabres' farm team during the 2006–07 season.

See also
 2006–07 NHL season

References
 Game log: Buffalo Sabres game log on espn.com
 Team standings: NHL standings on espn.com

External links
 Official website of the Buffalo Sabres

Presidents' Trophy seasons
Buff
Buff
Buffalo Sabres seasons
Buffalo
Buffalo